Göran Schildt  (11 March 1917 – 24 January 2009) was a Finnish Swede author and art historian. He was the son of the author Runar Schildt.

Life and work 

Schildt is perhaps best known for his travelogues with the sailboat Daphne. He made the decision to become a Mediterranean sailor after being seriously injured during the Finnish Winter War and forced to spend a year and a half in hospital. "Then I thought that if I can do this, I will realize my dream: I will get a boat and sail around all corners of the Mediterranean," he later said. The architect Alvar Aalto was one of the guests at Daphne and their lifelong friendship was the basis for Schildt's masterpiece, the three-part biography of Aalto.

He received his doctorate in philosophy with a dissertation on the painter Cezanne and also studied languages ​​at the Sorbonne in Paris. He moved to Sweden in 1945 and was an employee of Svenska Dagbladet 1951–1990. He was offered an art professorship at the University of Helsinki, but chose to continue as a writer.

Göran Schildt lived in Villa Skeppet in Ekenäs in Finland and in Villa Kolkis on the island of Leros in Greece. He was married in 1941–1964 to the glass artist Mona Morales-Schildt and from 1966 to Christine Schildt, born Werthmann (1940–).

Publications 
Schildt has written at least 30 publications in Swedish.

Awards and recognition 
Person has received the following awards and recognition: 

 1950 – 
 1952 – 
 1981 – Svenska Akademiens Finlandspris
 1991 – 
 2000 – Member of Royal Swedish Academy of Fine Arts

References

External links 
 

1917 births
2009 deaths
Writers from Helsinki
Finnish writers in Swedish
Writers from Uusimaa
20th-century Finnish novelists
Swedish-speaking Finns
Finnish expatriates in Greece
Finnish expatriates in Sweden